Route nationale 2  (RN2) is a primary highway in Madagascar. The route runs from the capital city of Antananarivo to Toamasina, a city on the eastern coast of the Madagascar.

The twisting route is served by taxi-brousses and buses.

Selected locations on route (from west to east)
Antananarivo
Ambohimangakely
Sambaina
Ambanitsena
Manjakandriana (48 km from Antananarivo)
Mangoro River Bridge
Moramanga (junction with RN 44)
Analamazoatra Reserve and Andasibe-Mantadia National Park
Beforona
Ranomafana Est
Antsampanana (junction with RN 11)
Brickaville
Rianila River Bridge
Toamasina

See also 
 List of roads in Madagascar 
 Transport in Madagascar

References 

Roads in Madagascar
 Roads in Analamanga
 Roads in Alaotra-Mangoro
 Roads in Atsinanana